Michael Cumpsty (born 28 February 1960) is a British actor. He has been acting since childhood. He has worked extensively performing Shakespeare, as well as both musicals and dramas on Broadway. He also performs in films and on television.

Life and career
Cumpsty was born in Wakefield, West Riding of Yorkshire, and moved to South Africa with his family when he was 9. Cumpsty attended Haileybury College in Hertfordshire and received a Bachelor of Arts in English from University of North Carolina at Chapel Hill in 1982.

On the Broadway stage he appeared in dramas, including La Bête (1991), Timon of Athens (1993), The Heiress (1995), Copenhagen (2000), and The Constant Wife (2005). He appeared on Broadway in the play End of the Rainbow in 2012 and received a Tony Award nomination for Featured Actor for his performance. He appeared in the Los Angeles production of the play, which ran in March and April 2013 at the Ahmanson Theatre. He appeared in the Roundabout Theatre production of Machinal as the "husband" from December 2013 to 2 March 2014.

In Broadway stage musicals, he played John Dickinson in the revival of 1776 (1997), and Julian Marsh in the revival of 42nd Street (2001). He played the role of Jules in the revival of Sunday in the Park With George in 2008.

In off-Broadway work, he co-directed a Classic Stage Company production of Richard III in 2007, as well as played the title role. Other Shakespeare roles include the title role in Timon of Athens in 1996, Parolles in All's Well That Ends Well in 1993, Laertes in Hamlet in 1990, Time/Lord in The Winter's Tale in 1989, and Escalus in Romeo and Juliet in 1988, all at the Public Theater. He played the title role in the Classic Stage Company production of Hamlet in 2005, winning the Obie Award.

Cumpsty's television credits include daytime soap operas such as One Life to Live and All My Children, recurring roles on the primetime dramas L.A. Law in 1991 as "killer litigator" Frank Kittridge, Severance as Security Chief Doug Graner, and Star Trek: Voyager as the holographic Lord Burleigh, and guest appearances on Matlock, The OA, and Law & Order.

Cumpsty's feature films include State of Grace (1990), Fatal Instinct (1993), Starting Out in the Evening (2007), The Ice Storm (1997), Eat Pray Love (2010) and The Visitor (2007).

Cumpsty appeared at the Two River Theater in Much Ado About Nothing in October 2011, in Present Laughter in 2013, and directed the Wendy Wasserstein play Third in 2014. He appeared in Absurd Person Singular as "Ronald" in January and on 1 February 2015. He said of the Two River Theater: "It’s similar to off-Broadway, but at a much nicer theater. And it’s different from Broadway because it’s not commercial so there’s less pressure. It’s exhilarating, too. The run is short (three or four weeks) then it’s gone. It’s kind of special..." He further said that he likes "language oriented work" and mentioned as examples Copenhagen  and the plays of Tom Stoppard.

Filmography

Films

TV

Personal life
His boyfriend, John Dias, is the artistic director of the Two River Theater Company in Red Bank, New Jersey, and they moved to New Jersey in 2010.

References

External links

English male film actors
English male stage actors
English male television actors
People from Wakefield
1960 births
Living people
English gay actors